Kuala Terengganu by-election of 2009 was held on 17 January 2009 after the death of the incumbent Member of Parliament, Razali Ismail. In the 2008 election, Datuk Razali won by a slim 628 vote majority, defeating Pan-Malaysian Islamic Party (PAS) heavyweight Mohamad Sabu and 89-year-old independent candidate, Maimun Yusuf. Prime Minister Datuk Seri Abdullah Ahmad Badawi and Barisan Nasional were confident that Barisan Nasional would retain the Kuala Terengganu parliamentary seat. The Prime Minister had rejected the assumption that there would be a big swing by the voters to the Opposition. Opposition leader Anwar Ibrahim stated that Parti Keadilan Rakyat (PKR) and the Democratic Action Party (DAP) would support any candidate that PAS picked. He was optimistic that Pakatan Rakyat would win in Kuala Terengganu if all its coalition parties worked hard against Barisan Nasional.  In the 2008 election Razali, a government minister of the UMNO party, defeated a PAS opposition candidate by 628 votes. For the by-election PAS nominated state assemblyman Mohd Abdul Wahid Endut, while Barisan Nasional nominated Wan Ahmad Farid Wan Salleh. Mohd Abdul won the by-election by 2,631 votes.

By-election results

References 

2009 elections in Malaysia
2009 in Malaysia
2009 Kuala Terengganu by-election
Elections in Terengganu